The ITTF Challenge Series is an annual series of table tennis tournaments organised by the International Table Tennis Federation (ITTF). Initially created in 2013 as the third tier of the ITTF World Tour (below the Super Series and Major Series), the Challenge Series became a separate tour in 2017. It is currently the ITTF's secondary tour, below the World Tour. 

Starting from 2019, the series will have two tiers: ITTF Challenge Plus and ITTF Challenge. Canada, Nigeria, North Korea, Oman, Paraguay, and Portugal were announced as host for the Challenge Plus tournaments for the 2019 season.

Tournaments

The following tournaments have featured as part of the ITTF Challenge Series since it separated from the ITTF World Tour in 2017.

See also
ITTF World Tour

References

External links
ITTF Challenge Series

 
International Table Tennis Federation
Table tennis tours and series
Recurring sporting events established in 2013